Code page 857 (CCSID 857) (also known as CP 857, IBM 00857, and OEM 857, MS-DOS Turkish) is a code page used under DOS in Turkey to write Turkish.

Code page 857 is based on code page 850, but with many changes. It includes all characters from ISO 8859-9.

CCSID 9049 is the euro currency update of code page/CCSID 857, which adds the euro sign at code point D5hex.

Character set
Each character is shown with its equivalent Unicode code point. Only the second half of the table (code points 128–255) is shown, the first half (code points 0–127) being the same as code page 850.

References

857